Jenny Tamburi (27 November 1952 – 1 March 2006), born as Luciana Tamburini, was an Italian actress and television hostess. Her first stage name was "Luciana della Robbia" and after her first film she changed it to "Jenny Tamburi".

Born in Rome, she debuted on stage with Johnny Dorelli at 17, in Aggiungi un posto a tavola.  Her film debut was in 1970 in Vittorio Caprioli's Splendours and miseries of Madame Royale, opposite Ugo Tognazzi. Tamburi portrayed a femme fatale in La seduzione (1973). She was active in genre films, especially commedia sexy all'italiana and giallo films.

After retiring from acting she worked as a casting director and opened a drama school in Rome.

Selected filmography 

 Splendori e miserie di Madame Royale (1970) - Mimmina
 Smile Before Death (1972) - Nancy Thompson 
 Fiorina la vacca (1972) - Zanetta - wife of Checco
 Women in Cell Block 7 (1973) - Daniela Vinci
 La seduzione (1973) - Graziella
 The Sinful Nuns of Saint Valentine (1974) - Lucita
 Morbosità (1974)
 La prova d'amore (1974) 
 Scandal in the Family (1975) - Francesca
 The Suspicious Death of a Minor (1975) - Gloria
 Frankenstein - Italian Style (1975) - Janet
 Sins Without Intentions (1975) - Stefania
 Giovannino (1976) - Marcella
 Confessions of a Frustrated Housewife (1976) - Diana
 Blood and Bullets (1976) - Susan
 Donna... cosa si fa per te (1976) - Sole
 Sette note in nero (1977) - Bruna
 Melodrammore (1977) - Priscilla Mulinetti
 Dove volano i corvi d'argento (1977) - Giovannangela
 Liquirizia (1979) - Marina
 Bello di mamma (1980) - Maddalena Trinacria
 Il tango della gelosia (1981) - Nunzia
 Pierino la peste alla riscossa (1982) - Signorina Bonazzi
 Lo studente (1983) - Claudia
 Voglia di guardare (1986) - Christina

References

External links 

 

1952 births
2006 deaths
Actresses from Rome
Italian film actresses
Italian stage actresses
Italian television presenters
Italian television actresses
Deaths from cancer in Lazio
Italian women television presenters